Kholodna Hora (meaning cold mountain) is a station on Kharkiv Metro's Kholodnohirsko–Zavodska Line. The station is the western terminus of the line and was opened on 23 August 1975. It is located under the Poltavsky Shosse, in the middle of the Kholodna Hora residential district in the western part of Kharkiv.

Until 8 October 1995, the station and the street on which it is located were known as Vulytsia Sverdlova (Sverdlov Street). Also, a bas-relief portrait of communist leader Yakov Sverdlov was located on the station, later removed. Two relief composite architectural items, which depicted communist scenes from the Velikiy Oktiabr and the Triumph of the Revolution, are still located on the station.

The station is put low underground, is a pillar-trispan with many white marble columns. The floor of the station has been finished off with red granite. It was designed by V.A Spivachyk; engineered by P.A. Bochikashvili and N.D. Ivanova; and decorated by V.I. Lenchin, P.P Yurchenko, and I.P. Yastrebov.

The Kholodna Hora station has two vestibules that are directly connected to the station and two exits, which have pedestrian cross tunnels under the Poltavsky Shosse. The large amount of passenger traffic on the station is accounted for by the many bus routes passing nearby, the buses carrying passengers to the neighboring towns and villages.

External links
 Kholodna Hora on Gortransport Kharkiv site

Kharkiv Metro stations
Railway stations opened in 1975